Montrose is a station on the Chicago Transit Authority's 'L' system. It is situated between the Damen and Irving Park stations on the Brown Line, which runs between Albany Park on Chicago's Northwest Side and downtown Chicago. It is an elevated station with two side platforms located at 1817 West Montrose Avenue in the Ravenswood neighborhood of Chicago's Lincoln Square community area.

Location
Montrose is situated on West Montrose Avenue, between its intersections with North Damen Avenue and North Ashland Avenue. The station is located in the Lincoln Square community area of Chicago; the area surrounding the station consists of a mixture commercial, residential and manufacturing areas.

History

Montrose station, and the corresponding Montrose Avenue, are both named after James Graham, 1st Marquess of Montrose, a Scottish nobleman.

Montrose Station opened in 1907 as part of the Northwestern Elevated Railroad's Ravenswood line. In CTA's skip-stop service on the Brown Line, instituted in 1949, Montrose was originally an "AB" station, but it was changed to "B" station in 1973, and remained that way until the CTA discontinued skip-stop service in 1995.

In 2006, the CTA began the Brown Line Capacity Expansion Project, which involved the renovation and reconstruction of all Brown Line stations to allow eight car trains to run on the line and to ensure that all stations met Americans with Disabilities Act (ADA) requirements.  Montrose station closed between December 2, 2006, and November 26, 2007, and was completely rebuilt.

Service
Montrose is part of the CTA's Brown Line, which runs between Albany Park and downtown Chicago. It is the seventh inbound station and is situated between the Damen and Irving Park stations. Brown Line trains serve Montrose between 4:00 am and 1:30 am on weekdays and Saturdays, and between 6:30 am and 12:20 am on Sundays; trains operate roughly every 3 to 10 minutes during rush hour, with longer headways of up to 15 minutes at night. 880,862 passengers boarded at Montrose in 2014.

Bus connections
CTA
  78 Montrose

Notes and references

Notes

References

External links 

 Montrose (Ravenswood Line) Station Page

CTA Brown Line stations
Railway stations in the United States opened in 1907
1907 establishments in Illinois